The 1950-51 French Rugby Union Championship of first division was contested by 48 teams divided into eight pools of six. Twenty-four teams qualified to play a second phase with eight pools of three clubs. The first of each pool were qualified to play in the quarterfinals.

The championship was won by Carmaux, which beat Stadoceste in the final. It was the only title won by Carmaux.

Context 

The 1951 Five Nations Championship was won by Ireland, while France finished second.

The "Coupe de France" was won by Lourdes, which beat Stadoceste in the final.

The situation both inside and outside the ground during the final was so bad that British unions asked to withdraw.

Second qualification round 

Teams that qualified for quarterfinals are in bold.

Quarterfinals 

Clubs in bold qualified for the semifinals.

Semifinals

Final

External links
 Compte rendu finale de 1951 lnr.fr

1951
France 1951
Championship